Silvia Seidel (23 September 1969 - 31 July 2012) was a German actress from Munich, who starred in the TV series Anna (1987), Halfway Across the Galaxy and Turn Left (1993), and Sturm der Liebe (2007). She also starred in the films  (1988), Faith (1990), and had a small role in The NeverEnding Story (1984). She died on 31 July 2012.

She took her own life after suffering from depression. 
Her mother had also taken her own life in 1992.
She is buried in the Grünwald Woodland Cemetery in Munich.

Filmography
The NeverEnding Story (1984)
 (1988)
Faith (1990)
Luise and the Jackpot (1995)
Mompen!? (1995)
Das bisschen Haushalt (2003)

Television
SOKO 5113 (1986-2011) (3 Episodes)
Anna (1987)
Anna - Eigentlich heiße ich Silvia Seidel (1989)
 (1992)
Halfway Across the Galaxy and Turn Left (1993)
Cluedo – Das Mörderspiel (1993)
Ein unvergeßliches Wochenende in St. Moritz (1995)
Parkhotel Stern (1997)
Der Pfundskerl (2002)
Um Himmels Willen (2002)
Tramitz & Friends (2004)
Leipzig Homicide (2005)
Siska (2006)
Sturm der Liebe (2007)
Unter Verdacht (2007)
Der Alte (2007-2010) (5 Episodes)
Die Rosenheim-Cops (2008-2011) (2 Episodes)
SOKO Kitzbühel (2009)
Da kommt Kalle  (2009)
In aller Freundschaft (2009)
Forsthaus Falkenau (2011)
Weißblaue Geschichten (2013)

Theater

Vier Frauen und ein Unfall as Heike
8 Frauen as Louise
Die süßesten Früchte as Claudia
Die Erbin as Catherine
Romantische Komödie as Phoebe
Ein Sommernachtstraum as Puck
Staatsaffairen as Irene
Sonntag in New York as Eileen
Midsummernight-Sexcomedy as Ariel
Bitterer Honig as Josephine
Johnny Belinda as Belinda
Wege mit Dir as Raika
Zusammen ist man weniger allein as Camille
Nie wieder arbeiten as Nicole
Ein Fünf-Sterne-Mann as Agueda
Frau Holle as Pechmarie 
Ein Traum von Hochzeit as Judy
Hotel zu den zwei Welten as Marie
Der Kreis as Catherine

Music Video
Richard Davis - Sometime (2005)

Book
Anna und ich. Tagebuch einer jungen Karriere. (1989)

References

External links

 

1969 births
2012 deaths
20th-century German actresses
21st-century German actresses
German film actresses
German television actresses
Actresses from Munich
2012 suicides
People from Munich
Suicides in Germany